Nasality may refer to:
 Nasalization, phonetic feature of normal speech
 Nasality (disorder), excessive nasalization as a speech disorder